LittleBigPlanet 2 (commonly abbreviated as LBP2) is a puzzle-platform game centred on user-generated content. The game was developed by Media Molecule, published by Sony Computer Entertainment Europe for PlayStation 3 and was released in January 2011.

Media Molecule has released numerous downloadable content (DLC) packs on the PlayStation Store. All DLC packs released for LittleBigPlanet are also compatible with the sequel, but those designed for LittleBigPlanet 2 are not available in the first game. All costumes from both LittleBigPlanet and LittleBigPlanet 2 are compatible with the PlayStation Vita version of the game, along with LittleBigPlanet Karting. The content of the game's DLC packs vary but include costumes, stickers, decorations, objects, music, creation tools and new levels. Some of these packs are available free of charge while others are available to purchase. Much of the development of LittleBigPlanets DLC is outsourced by Media Molecule to their development partners, Tarsier Studios, Fireproof Games and Supermassive Games. The packs announced to date are listed below.

Costume packs
Costume packs contain a selection of pre-assembled costumes as well as individual wearable items that can be combined with other pieces.

Creator kits and mini-packs
Creator kits are themed bundles including a number of stickers, decorations and objects. Mini-packs are usually based on other entertainment franchises and contain up to four costumes and a selection of themed stickers and decorations.

Premium level packs
Level packs include a series of levels with their own self-contained story. The player can unlock new objects, stickers, decorations, sound effects, music and creation tools by playing and completing the levels.

References

External links
Official LittleBigPlanet Downloadable Content Catalogue

Lists of video game downloadable content
Lists of video games by franchise
Video games scored by Winifred Phillips
D